John-Patrick Strauß (born 28 January 1996) is a professional footballer who plays as a right back for 2. Bundesliga club Hansa Rostock. Born in Germany, he represents the Philippines national team.

Club career

Youth
Born in Wetzlar, Germany, Strauß had his youth career at FC Cleeberg, TSG Wieseck and RB Leipzig.

RB Leipzig II
In 2016, after playing for the U17 and U19 team of Leipzig, Strauß was promoted to the second team.

Erzgebirge Aue
In 2017, Strauß signed a three-year contract with 2. Bundesliga club Erzgebirge Aue, he joined the club on a free transfer. In 2022, Erzgebirge Aue were relegated to 3. Liga.

Hansa Rostock
In 2022, after his 5-year stint with Aue, Strauß signed a two-year contract with 2. Bundesliga club Hansa Rostock, joining the club on a free transfer.

International career
Strauß was born to a German father and a Filipino mother that made him eligible to play for Germany and the Philippines.

Philippines
In September 2018, Strauß received a call-up from the Philippines for a national team training camp and a friendly game against Bahrain. Strauß received his first cap for the Philippines in a friendly match against Oman, he came in as a substitute replacing Martin Steuble in the 67th minute of the match.

Strauß scored his first goal for the Philippines in a 4–1 win against Guam in the second round of the 2022 FIFA World Cup qualifiers. Two months later, Strauß scored his second goal for the Philippines in a 2–1 away win against Maldives.

International goals
Scores and results list the Philippines' goal tally first.

References

External links
 

1996 births
Living people
People from Wetzlar
Sportspeople from Giessen (region)
German footballers
Association football midfielders
RB Leipzig II players
FC Erzgebirge Aue players
FC Hansa Rostock players
Regionalliga players
2. Bundesliga players
German sportspeople of Filipino descent
Citizens of the Philippines through descent
Footballers from Hesse
Filipino footballers
Philippines international footballers
2019 AFC Asian Cup players